Greifswald is a railway station  in the town of Greifswald, Mecklenburg-Vorpommern, Germany. The station lies on the Angermünde–Stralsund railway and the train services are operated by Deutsche Bahn and Ostdeutsche Eisenbahn.

Train services
The station is served by the following services:

References

TrainStation
Railway stations in Mecklenburg-Western Pomerania
Railway stations in Germany opened in 1863
Buildings and structures in Vorpommern-Greifswald